The Albin 79 is a Swedish sailboat that was designed by Rolf Magnusson as an International Offshore Rule Quarter Ton class cruiser-racer and first built in 1974.

The Albin 79 designation indicates its length overall in decimetres.

Production
The design was built by Albin Marine in Sweden from 1974 to 1977, with about 250 boats completed, but it is now out of production.

Design
The Albin 79 is a recreational keelboat, built predominantly of fibreglass, with wood trim. It has a masthead sloop rig with aluminum spars, a deck-stepped mast, wire standing rigging and a single set of unswept spreaders. The hull has a raked stem; a raised counter, reverse transom; a skeg-mounted rudder controlled by a tiller and a fixed fin keel. It displaces  and carries  of lead ballast.

The design has sleeping accommodation for four to six people, with one cabin and one head.

See also
List of sailing boat types

References

External links

Keelboats
1970s sailboat type designs
Sailing yachts
Sailboat type designs by Rolf Magnusson
Sailboat types built by Albin Marine